Slaley may refer to:
Slaley, Derbyshire
Slaley, Northumberland